John Philip Durack  (born 18 May 1956) is an Australian barrister and former first-class cricketer.

The son of Peter Durack, he was born at Perth in May 1956. He later studied at the University of Western Australia, before going to England to study for his Bachelor of Civil Law at Magdalen College, Oxford. While studying at Oxford, he played first-class cricket for Oxford University in 1980, making seven appearances. In his seven matches, he scored 136 runs at an average of 10.46 with a high score of 45. After graduating from Oxford, Durack returned to Australia where he is a practicing barrister.

References

External links

1956 births
Living people
Cricketers from Perth, Western Australia
University of Western Australia alumni
Alumni of Magdalen College, Oxford
Australian cricketers
Oxford University cricketers
Australian barristers